The 7.5×55mm Swiss or 7,5mm GP 11 (or unofficially 7.5×55mm Schmidt–Rubin) is a cartridge developed for the Swiss Army. It originated from the Gewehrpatrone 1890 (7.5×53.5mm) developed in 1898 by mechanical engineer Lt. Col. Eduard Rubin for rifles based on Rudolf Schmidt's action design.  The 7.5×55mm Swiss GP 11 cartridge is similar in appearance to the slightly smaller 7.5×54mm French round though the two are not interchangeable.

History of preceding and related cartridge variants

Preceding GP 90 and GP 90/03 cartridges

The Gewehrpatrone 1890 cartridge has been in Swiss Army service since 1889 in their Schmidt–Rubin Model 1889 rifles. The previous generation of the military calibres used in Europe at the time were 10 to 14 mm (and black powder) as opposed to 7.5 mm of the Schmidt–Rubin ammunition, but the transition was underway in late 1880s (e. g., 8×50mmR Lebel was adopted in 1886 and 7.65×53mm Mauser in 1889). It was one of the first with 7.5 mm copper-jacketed rounds similar to those used today. Originally using PC 88 ("powder composition-88")  ("low smoke" - equivalent to "smokeless") cut tubular smokeless single-base powder relying on nitrocellulose as its propellant ingredient, it was known as the Gewehrpatrone 1890. The Gewehrpatrone 1890 round was loaded with a paper-patched lead hollow based heeled steel-capped round-nose bullet. Starting from the rear of the nose section the bullets were wrapped around by two turns of paper, much like cotton patches were placed around the bullet of a musket. This paper patching reduced metallic fouling of the barrel and was supposed to aid in the gas seal of the bullet.

It was discovered that the primer was far too corrosive, so it was updated in 1903 to the Gewehrpatrone 1890/03 cartridge.

GP 90/23 cartridge variant for the Model 1889 rifle

Long after the discontinuation of the Schmidt–Rubin Model 1889 rifle in the Swiss armed forces, the GP 90/03 cartridge was updated in 1923 and designated the Gewehrpatrone 1890/23 (officially abbreviated GP 90/23 after ca. 1961), for use in shooting competitions. The GP 90/23 was a 7.5×54.5mm round developed to be able to be used in arms chambered for Gewehrpatrone 1890 and GP 11 ammunition. The GP 90/23 operating chamber pressure was slightly higher compared to Gewehrpatrone 1890 ammunition and significantly lower compared to GP 11 ammunition. The GP 90/23 dispensed with the paper patching around the bullet and was loaded with a full metal jacket (FMJ) non-heeled round-nose bullet. The PC 88 propellant shape was changed to square flakes.

Gewehrpatrone 1890, Gewehrpatrone 1890/03 and GP 90/23 ammunition were available in nine different variants.

GP 11 cartridge

In 1911 the metallurgy and bolt design in Swiss military rifles had advanced enough that a more powerful cartridge could be used in the Model 1911 rifles and Schmidt–Rubin 1896/11 rifles. The 7.5mm Swiss round was updated to the completely non-corrosive 7.5×55mmm Gewehrpatrone 1911 (GP 11). The bolt thrust of the GP 11 round is relatively high compared to many other service rounds used in the early 20th century. Besides being used in the Model 1911 and Schmidt–Rubin 1896/11 rifles, GP 11 ammunition was also used in the MG 11 machine gun, K11 and K31 carbines as well as in the Stgw 57 battle rifles. The cartridge saw extensive service until the early 1990s with the standard rifles of Swiss servicemen, and still sees use by Swiss Army reservists and sport shooters, of which there are many. Furthermore, it is still the standard ammunition for the MG 51 general purpose machine gun used on many Swiss armored vehicles, such as the Pz 87 "Leopard 2" tank and the MOWAG Eagle reconnaissance vehicle. In this role, it is usually belt fed with GP 11 full metal jacket and GP 11 tracer rounds.

The GP 11 cartridge used double-base powder combining nitrocellulose (gun cotton) with about 30% nitroglycerin as propellants and is loaded to a significantly higher operating chamber pressure compared to GP 90 ammunition.
The  full metal jacket GP 11 boat tail spitzer bullet was when adopted an innovative bullet design. The GP 11 bullet contained a lead-antimony core and its jacket was made of plated steel or tombac. Depending on the year of production the plating was made of copper, brass, nickel or copper-nickel. The GP 11 cartridge cases were made of brass (72% of copper and 28% zinc) or, from May 1943 to January 1947, due to supply shortages in Switzerland, of aluminum or steel. The GP 11 bullet offered good aerodynamic efficiency and ballistic performance with a ballistic coefficient (G1 BC) of 0.505 to 0.514. Even by 2011 standards,  typical effective range is quite remarkable for a standard military rifle round that is more than a century old.

The GP 11 bullet set off the militaries of countries like Germany, the United States and the United Kingdom at the onset of and after World War I to develop and field similar full metal jacket boat tail spitzer bullets to improve the maximum useful range and long-range performance of the full metal jacket flat-based spitzer bullet designs they used. The useful maximum range is defined by the maximum range of a small-arms projectile while still maintaining the minimum kinetic energy required to put unprotected personnel out of action, which is generally believed to be 15 kilogram-meters (147 J / 108 ft⋅lbf).

Since its introduction in 1911 the GP 11 cartridge featured some technical development. In 1942 the square flake-shaped double-base propellant was replaced by tubular shaped double-base propellant. Further, there were minor developments regarding the projectiles, sealing and primers. GP 11 cartridges were mass-produced for the Swiss military in the ammunition factories in Altdorf and in Thun until 1994. The last 1994 produced ammunition had lot No. 349-94. Previously GP 11 was also produced in Rotenburg and Solothurn as other municipalities in Switzerland. In 2016 GP 11 production was resumed by RUAG to fulfill Swiss military needs.

GP 11 is regarded as highly accurate and well-manufactured service ammunition. For Swiss military service ammunition the primer-type is Berdan. Berdan-primed ammunition is not easy for reloading previously fired cartridges.

In addition to the standard full metal jacket GP 11 rounds, specialty rounds were produced as well for the Swiss military. Armor-piercing steel-core rounds can be identified by their violet bases. These rounds can easily pierce 5 mm (0.2 in) of steel plate at 500 m (550 yards). Tracer rounds burn out to 800 m (875 yards), and can be identified by their red tips.

When all modifications are combined GP 11 ammunition was available in a total of 40 different versions.

Specifications

Variants overview

Due to the greater pressures produced by the GP 11 rounds, they are not fired in Model 1889 Schmidt–Rubin rifles.

7.5×55mm Swiss / GP 11
The 7.5×55mm Swiss / GP 11 cartridge (designated as the 7.5 × 55 Suisse by the C.I.P.) has 4.22 ml (65 grains) H2O cartridge case capacity. The exterior shape of the case was designed to promote reliable case feeding and extraction in bolt-action rifles and machine guns alike, under extreme conditions.

7.5×55mm Swiss / GP 11 maximum C.I.P. cartridge dimensions. All sizes in millimeters (mm).

Americans would define the shoulder angle at alpha/2 ≈ 30.5 degrees. The common rifling twist rate for this cartridge is 270 mm (1 in 10.63 in), 4 grooves, Ø lands = , Ø grooves = , land width = , and the primer type is Berdan or large rifle.

According to the official Commission Internationale Permanente pour l'Epreuve des Armes à Feu Portatives  (C.I.P.) rulings, the 7.5×55mm Swiss can handle up to  Pmax piezo pressure. In C.I.P. regulated countries every rifle cartridge combo has to be proofed at 125% of this maximum C.I.P. pressure to certify for sale to consumers. This means that 7.5×55mm Swiss / GP 11 chambered arms in C.I.P. regulated countries are currently (2016) proof tested at  PE piezo pressure.

Switzerland is not a C.I.P. member state and therefore does not recognize any C.I.P. rulings and proofed its military 7.5×55mm rifles chambered in the GP 11 version of their service cartridge at 150% of the GP 11 load pressure of 313.717 MPa (45,500 psi). Swiss 7.5×55mm GP 11 proof tests are therefore not recognized in C.I.P. member states in their turn.

Civilian use
Due to the uncommon  diameter bolt face the 7.5×55mm Swiss GP 11 was and is rarely chambered in civilian target or hunting guns made outside Switzerland.

Due to the availability of surplus K31 rifles on the civilian market, a number of cartridge manufacturers, such as Prvi Partizan, produce 7.5×55mm GP 11-like rounds in full metal jacket, soft-tip, and ballistic tip configurations. Civilian manufacturers also produce similar cartridge cases with Boxer large rifle primers for easier reloading.

Reloading
Despite its nomenclature, the 7.5×55mm Swiss can use the same 7.62 mm (.308 in) bullets as conventional 7.62 mm (.308 in) cartridges that have slightly wider land and groove diameters. This allows for ease of handloading and custom competition or hunting loads, as nearly any .308 diameter bullet may be used. However, most Swiss match shooters use standard GP 11 surplus ammunition, a testament to the quality of the factory loading 
of the GP 11 round.

While the scarcity of reloadable cartridge cases previously made the 7.5 mm Swiss problematic for US shooters, reloadable cases are easily produced by reforming .284 Winchester brass.  Case rims are slightly undersized, but this presents no problems so long as the rifle's extractor is in good condition. This allows the handloader to produce a GP90 load that is safe for the Schmidt–Rubin Model 1889 rifle. Prvi Partizan has been producing new made brass for reloaders as well as loaded ammunition so supplies of reloadable brass are less difficult to obtain.

Use 
 Swiss Mannlicher M1893 Carbine
 Schmidt-Rubin Infantry rifle 
 SIG Mondragón M1908 
 MG 11
 Schmidt-Rubin Karabiner K31
 Schmidt-Rubin Zf. Kar. 55
 Furrer Lmg 25
 Flieger MG 29
 Reibel Pz Mg 38
 AK44
 MG 51
 SIG SG 510
 LUVO Arms LA-11

Gallery

See also
 List of rifle cartridges
 Table of handgun and rifle cartridges
 7 mm caliber

References

 C.I.P. CD-ROM edition 2003
 C.I.P. decisions, texts and tables (free current C.I.P. CD-ROM version download (ZIP and RAR format))

External links

The History The 7.5 Swiss Cartridge
7,5×55 Swiss information from Norma
7.5 × 55 Swiss at www.reloadersnest.com
Gian-Marchet 7,5 × 55 Schweizer Patronen Page (including images)

Pistol and rifle cartridges
7.5×55mm Swiss firearms
Military cartridges